The College of Engineering is the engineering school of Texas A&M University in College Station and is home to more than 15,000 engineering students in 14 departments.

According to a 2009 report by the American Society for Engineering Education, the college is 2nd in the nation in undergraduate enrollment, and 6th in graduate enrollment. The same report ranks the College 8th in engineering degrees granted, 8th for the number of Hispanics and 10th for the number of women granted degrees. The college is 11th nationally for the number of doctoral degrees granted and 12th for master's degrees granted. The College is recognized among the top public engineering colleges for its undergraduate and graduate programs.

History

The first engineering department at Texas A&M appeared in 1880, four years after the foundation of the school, with the creation of the Department of Engineering, Mechanics, and Drawing. For the next several years, the curriculum focused on practical training to assist students in finding industrial and vocational work. By 1887, separate departments had been created for mechanical engineering and for civil engineering and drawing.

To assist the United States during World War I, the Department of Mechanical Engineering shifted focus to train blacksmiths, automobile mechanics, machinists, draftsmen, general mechanics, and pipe fitters for the war. Following the war, the department's enrollment continued to increase, and it began offering courses in power, industrial and railway, or transportation engineering. In the 1930s, these options were eliminated, while others, including aerodynamics, air-conditioning and physical metallurgy began to be offered. During the 1936-1937 school year, the Department of Mechanical Engineering was first accredited by the Engineering Council for Professional Development, now known as the Accreditation Board for Engineering and Technology.

By 1940, the engineering school comprised almost half of Texas A&M's enrollment. As World War II dawned, the school again assisted the war effort, with the Department of Mechanical Engineering faculty volunteering to teach at military bases throughout the state. Following the war, college introduced a Ph.D. program, and industries and government began to sponsor research within the college.

Academics

Degrees offered

Aerospace Engineering - BS, MS, MEng, PhD
Architectural Engineering - BS
Biological and Agricultural Engineering – BS, MS, MEng, MAgr, PhD, EngD
Biomedical Engineering - BS, MS, MEng, PhD
Chemical Engineering - BS, MS, MEng, PhD
Civil Engineering - BS, MS, MEng, PhD
Computer Engineering - BS, MS, MEng, PhD
Computer Science - BS, MS, MCS, PhD
Computing - BA
Electrical Engineering - BS, MS, MEng, PhD
Electronic Systems Engineering Technology - BS
Engineering - ME, DE
Engineering Systems Management - MS
Engineering Technical Management - MBA
Engineering Technology - MS
Environmental Engineering - BS
Health Physics - MS
Industrial Distribution - BS, MID
Industrial Engineering - BS, MS, ME, PhD
Interdisciplinary Engineering - PhD
Manufacturing and Mechanical Engineering Technology - BS 
Marine Engineering Technology - BS
Materials Science and Engineering - MS, ME, PhD
Mechanical Engineering - BS, MS, ME, PhD
Multidisciplinary Engineering Technology - BS
Nuclear Engineering - BS, MS, ME, PhD
Ocean Engineering - BS, MS, ME, PhD
Petroleum Engineering - BS, MS, ME, PhD
Radiological Health Engineering - BS
Safety Engineering - MS

Rankings
The 2019 edition of the U.S. News & World Report ranks the Texas A&M University College of Engineering graduate program 15th and the undergraduate program 14th.

Individual engineering programs as ranked among public institutions by U.S. News & World Report:
 Aerospace: 10th graduate (2019), 9th undergraduate (2019)
 Biological and Agricultural: 3rd graduate(2019), 2nd undergraduate (2019)
 Biomedical: 89th graduate
 Chemical: 15th graduate, 19th undergraduate
 Computer Engineering: 13th graduate, 11th undergraduate
 Computer Science: 27th graduate
 Civil Engineering: 8th graduate, 10th undergraduate (2019)
 Electrical: 14th graduate, 9th undergraduate
 Industrial and Systems Engineering: 11th graduate (2019), 11th undergraduate (2019)
 Mechanical: 9th graduate, 9th undergraduate
 Nuclear: 5th graduate (2019), 2nd undergraduate
 Petroleum: 2nd graduate (2019), 2nd undergraduate (2019)

Research
The 2010 U.S. News & World Report ranked the College third in engineering research expenditures, with $248.4 million spent.

In 2005, the College had $179 million in engineering research expenditures, making it the 5th college nationally in research expenditures.

The College maintains responsibility for three independent agencies:  the Texas A&M Engineering Experiment Station (TEES), the Texas A&M Engineering Extension Service (TEEX), and the Texas A&M Transportation Institute (TTI).

References

Educational institutions established in 1880
Engineering schools and colleges in the United States
Engineering universities and colleges in Texas
Texas A&M University colleges and schools
1880 establishments in Texas